A penumbral lunar eclipse took place on Wednesday, October 7, 1987, the second of two lunar eclipses in 1987, the first being on April 14, 1987. The Moon approached within 0.00949% of its diameter outside of touching the Earth’s umbral shadow at maximum eclipse; 98.63% of the Moon's disc was partially shaded by the Earth, with the overall eclipse lasting 4 hours and 14 minutes. While less dramatic than a partial eclipse (as no part of the Moon was in complete shadow), a shading across the Moon should have been readily visible to observers. The Moon was just 3.1 days after perigee (Perigee on Sunday, October 4, 1987), making it 2.1% larger than average.

Visibility

Related lunar eclipses

Eclipses of 1987 
 A hybrid solar eclipse on March 29.
 A penumbral lunar eclipse on April 14.
 An annular solar eclipse on September 23.
 A penumbral lunar eclipse on October 7.

Lunar year series

Half-Saros cycle
A lunar eclipse will be preceded and followed by solar eclipses by 9 years and 5.5 days (a half saros). This lunar eclipse is related to two partial solar eclipses of Solar Saros 153.

See also 
List of lunar eclipses
List of 20th-century lunar eclipses

Notes

External links 
 

1987-10
1987 in science
October 1987 events